Peroba, paroba, parova, perobeira, perova and peroveira are common names for various tree species in the families: 
Apocynaceae
Bignoniaceae

Species known by this name have important use in the timber industry, especially the species referred to as peroba rosa (Aspidosperma peroba).

Peroba is also applied to the following species:
Peroba
Peroba-açu
Peroba-amarela
Peroba-amarga
Peroba-amargosa
Peroba-branca
Peroba-brava (Clethra laevigata)
Peroba-café (Clethra laevigata)
Peroba-cetim (Aspidosperma macrocarpon)
Peroba-comum (Aspidosperma polyneuron)
Peroba-d'água (Cestrum toledii)
Peroba-de-campos (Aspidosperma tomentosum)
Peroba-de-folha-larga (Aspidosperma cuspa)
Peroba-de-goiás
Peroba-de-gomo
Peroba-de-lagoa-santa (Aspidosperma cylindrocarpon)
Peroba-de-minas (Aspidosperma cylindrocarpon)
Peroba-de-rego (Aspidosperma compactinervium)
Peroba-de-santa-catarina (Aspidosperma parvifolium)
Peroba-de-são-paulo
Peroba-do-campo (Aspidosperma macrocarpon)
Peroba-do-cerrado (Aspidosperma tomentosum)
Peroba-do-rio
Peroba-dos-campos (Aspidosperma tomentosum)
Peroba-iquira (Aspidosperma cylindrocarpon)
Peroba-manchada (Paratecoma peroba)
Peroba-miúda
Peroba-paulista
Peroba-poca (Aspidosperma cylindrocarpon)
Peroba-rosa
Peroba-tabuada (Aspidosperma compactinervium)
Peroba-tambu (Aspidosperma parvifolium)
Peroba-tigrina (Paratecoma peroba)
Peroba-tremida (Paratecoma peroba)
Peroba-vermelha

References